William Hiorne (c. 1712 – 22 April 1776) was an architect and builder based in Warwick.

With his younger brother David Hiorne (1715–58), he worked for William Smith of Warwick and they succeeded Smith in business.

His son, Francis Hiorne also became an architect.

His memorial is in St Mary’s Church, Warwick.

Works

Four Oaks Hall. 1740 remodelling 
Memorial to Thomas Cross Field, St Andrew’s Church, Rugby 1744
St Michael's Church, Coventry 1747 new wings for the altar piece
Arbury Hall, Warwickshire from c. 1748
St Bartholomew’s Church, Birmingham 1749 
Memorial to Edward Action (d1747) in St Margaret’s Church, Acton Scott 1751
Guys Cliffe House 1751
Edgbaston Hall, Warwickshire 1751-52 internal alterations
Rode Hall 1752
King Edward's School, Birmingham 1752 library fittings
Holy Cross Church, Daventry 1752–1758 
St Martin in the Bull Ring 1753 spire repairs and 1760 vestry and lobby at east end of the north aisle
Kyre Park, Tenbury Wells 1753-56
Delbury Hall, Diddlebury, Shropshire 1753-56
Shire Hall, Warwick 1754–58 (built to the designs of Sanderson Miller)
Derby Country Gaol 1755-56
Meriden Hall, Warwickshire 1757-58 addition of attic 
Stable-block, Packington Hall, Warwickshire 1756–58 (designed by Sanderson Miller)
St Mary's Church, Nottingham 1762 new west front
Holy Trinity Church, Stratford-upon-Avon 1763-64 rebuilding of spire in stone
St Leonard's Church, Over Whitacre 1766

References

18th-century English architects
1712 births
1776 deaths
Architects from Warwickshire